Ahmed Ali Salem Khamis Al-Abri (born 28 January 1990), known as Ahmed Ali, is an Emirati football player who currently plays for Al Dhfra as a left midfielder.  He appeared in the UAE team at the 2012 Summer Olympics.

Career statistics

National Team
As of 27 September 2009

1Continental competitions include the AFC U-19 Championship
2Other tournaments include the FIFA U-20 World Cup

Club

1Continental competitions include the AFC Champions League
2Other tournaments include the UAE President Cup and Etisalat Emirates Cup

References

External links
 
 
 
 

1990 births
Living people
Emirati footballers
United Arab Emirates international footballers
Al Wahda FC players
Baniyas Club players
Al Dhafra FC players
Al-Wasl F.C. players
Footballers at the 2012 Summer Olympics
Olympic footballers of the United Arab Emirates
UAE Pro League players
Asian Games medalists in football
Footballers at the 2010 Asian Games
Asian Games silver medalists for the United Arab Emirates
Association football midfielders
Medalists at the 2010 Asian Games